The arrondissement of Dax is an arrondissement of France in the Landes department in the Nouvelle-Aquitaine region. It has 152 communes.

Composition

The communes of the arrondissement of Dax, and their INSEE codes, are:

 Amou (40002)
 Angoumé (40003)
 Angresse (40004)
 Argelos (40007)
 Arsague (40011)
 Audon (40018)
 Azur (40021)
 Baigts (40023)
 Bassercles (40027)
 Bastennes (40028)
 Bégaar (40031)
 Bélus (40034)
 Bénesse-lès-Dax (40035)
 Bénesse-Maremne (40036)
 Bergouey (40038)
 Beylongue (40040)
 Beyries (40041)
 Biarrotte (40042)
 Biaudos (40044)
 Bonnegarde (40047)
 Brassempouy (40054)
 Cagnotte (40059)
 Candresse (40063)
 Capbreton (40065)
 Carcarès-Sainte-Croix (40066)
 Carcen-Ponson (40067)
 Cassen (40068)
 Castaignos-Souslens (40069)
 Castelnau-Chalosse (40071)
 Castel-Sarrazin (40074)
 Castets (40075)
 Cauneille (40077)
 Caupenne (40078)
 Clermont (40084)
 Dax (40088)
 Doazit (40089)
 Donzacq (40090)
 Estibeaux (40095)
 Gaas (40101)
 Gamarde-les-Bains (40104)
 Garrey (40106)
 Gaujacq (40109)
 Gibret (40112)
 Goos (40113)
 Gourbera (40114)
 Gousse (40115)
 Gouts (40116)
 Habas (40118)
 Hastingues (40120)
 Hauriet (40121)
 Herm (40123)
 Heugas (40125)
 Hinx (40126)
 Josse (40129)
 Labatut (40132)
 Labenne (40133)
 Lahosse (40141)
 Laluque (40142)
 Lamothe (40143)
 Larbey (40144)
 Laurède (40147)
 Léon (40150)
 Lesgor (40151)
 Le Leuy (40153)
 Lévignacq (40154)
 Linxe (40155)
 Lit-et-Mixe (40157)
 Louer (40159)
 Lourquen (40160)
 Magescq (40168)
 Marpaps (40173)
 Maylis (40177)
 Mées (40179)
 Meilhan (40180)
 Messanges (40181)
 Mimbaste (40183)
 Misson (40186)
 Moliets-et-Maa (40187)
 Montfort-en-Chalosse (40194)
 Mouscardès (40199)
 Mugron (40201)
 Narrosse (40202)
 Nassiet (40203)
 Nerbis (40204)
 Nousse (40205)
 Oeyregave (40206)
 Oeyreluy (40207)
 Onard (40208)
 Ondres (40209)
 Orist (40211)
 Orthevielle (40212)
 Orx (40213)
 Ossages (40214)
 Ozourt (40216)
 Pey (40222)
 Peyrehorade (40224)
 Pomarez (40228)
 Pontonx-sur-l'Adour (40230)
 Port-de-Lanne (40231)
 Pouillon (40233)
 Poyanne (40235)
 Poyartin (40236)
 Préchacq-les-Bains (40237)
 Rion-des-Landes (40243)
 Rivière-Saas-et-Gourby (40244)
 Saint-André-de-Seignanx (40248)
 Saint-Aubin (40249)
 Saint-Barthélemy (40251)
 Saint-Cricq-du-Gave (40254)
 Sainte-Marie-de-Gosse (40271)
 Saint-Étienne-d'Orthe (40256)
 Saint-Geours-d'Auribat (40260)
 Saint-Geours-de-Maremne (40261)
 Saint-Jean-de-Lier (40263)
 Saint-Jean-de-Marsacq (40264)
 Saint-Julien-en-Born (40266)
 Saint-Laurent-de-Gosse (40268)
 Saint-Lon-les-Mines (40269)
 Saint-Martin-de-Hinx (40272)
 Saint-Martin-de-Seignanx (40273)
 Saint-Michel-Escalus (40276)
 Saint-Pandelon (40277)
 Saint-Paul-lès-Dax (40279)
 Saint-Vincent-de-Paul (40283)
 Saint-Vincent-de-Tyrosse (40284)
 Saint-Yaguen (40285)
 Saubion (40291)
 Saubrigues (40292)
 Saubusse (40293)
 Saugnac-et-Cambran (40294)
 Seignosse (40296)
 Seyresse (40300)
 Siest (40301)
 Soorts-Hossegor (40304)
 Sorde-l'Abbaye (40306)
 Sort-en-Chalosse (40308)
 Souprosse (40309)
 Soustons (40310)
 Taller (40311)
 Tarnos (40312)
 Tartas (40313)
 Tercis-les-Bains (40314)
 Téthieu (40315)
 Tilh (40316)
 Tosse (40317)
 Toulouzette (40318)
 Uza (40322)
 Vicq-d'Auribat (40324)
 Vielle-Saint-Girons (40326)
 Vieux-Boucau-les-Bains (40328)
 Villenave (40330)
 Yzosse (40334)

History

The arrondissement of Dax was created in 1800.

As a result of the reorganisation of the cantons of France which came into effect in 2015, the borders of the cantons are no longer related to the borders of the arrondissements. The cantons of the arrondissement of Dax were, as of January 2015:

 Amou
 Castets
 Dax-Nord
 Dax-Sud
 Montfort-en-Chalosse
 Mugron
 Peyrehorade
 Pouillon
 Saint-Martin-de-Seignanx
 Saint-Vincent-de-Tyrosse
 Soustons
 Tartas-Est
 Tartas-Ouest

References

Dax